Margaret Strong may refer to:

 Margaret Rockefeller Strong de Larraín, Marquesa de Cuevas, Rockefeller granddaughter and activist
 Margaret Strong De Patta, American jeweller
 Margaret Woodbury Strong, collector of toys and philanthropist